Madison is a city in Yolo County, California. Madison's ZIP Code is 95653 and its area code 530. The 2020 United States census reported Madison's population was 721.

History
The Cache Creek post office opened in 1852, moved, and changed its name to Madison in 1877. The name was bestowed by Daniel Bradley Hulbert after his hometown, Madison, Wisconsin. The townsite was laid out and named "Madison" in 1877 when the railroad, the Vaca Valley and Clear Lake Railroad, reached that spot, as the terminus, after expanding north from Winters. The Cache Creek Post Office had been located in the settlement of Cottonwood, approximately one mile south of Madison. Many of Cottonwood's structures were then moved to Madison, as Cottonwood did not have a railroad stop. Madison was first featured on the map in 1951.

Geography
According to the United States Census Bureau, the town covers an area of 1.547 square miles (4.007 km), all of it land.

Demographics
At the 2020 census Madison had a population of 721. The racial makeup of Madison was 224 (44.5%) White, 1 (0.2%) African American, 8 (1.6%) Native American, 3 (0.6%) Asian, 3 (0.6%) Pacific Islander, 235 (46.7%) from other races, and 29 (5.8%) from two or more races. Hispanic or Latino of any race were 384 people (76.3%).

The census reported that 721 people (99.6% of the population) lived in households, 2 (0.4%) lived in non-institutionalized group quarters, and no one was institutionalized.

There were 135 households, 71 (52.6%) had children under the age of 18 living in them, 77 (57.0%) were opposite-sex married couples living together, 20 (14.8%) had a female householder with no husband present, 12 (8.9%) had a male householder with no wife present.  There were 9 (6.7%) unmarried opposite-sex partnerships, and 1 (0.7%) same-sex married couples or partnerships. 16 households (11.9%) were one person and 5 (3.7%) had someone living alone who was 65 or older. The average household size was 3.71.  There were 109 families (80.7% of households); the average family size was 4.14.

The age distribution was 155 people (30.8%) under the age of 18, 55 people (10.9%) aged 18 to 24, 130 people (25.8%) aged 25 to 44, 120 people (23.9%) aged 45 to 64, and 43 people (8.5%) who were 65 or older.  The median age was 28.6 years. For every 100 females, there were 113.1 males.  For every 100 females aged 18 and over, there were 110.9 males.

There were 141 housing units at an average density of 91.1 per square mile, of the occupied units 86 (63.7%) were owner-occupied and 49 (36.3%) were rented. The homeowner vacancy rate was 0%; the rental vacancy rate was 3.9%.  326 people (64.8% of the population) lived in owner-occupied housing units and 175 people (34.8%) lived in rental housing units.

References

External links

Cities in Yolo County, California
Incorporated cities and towns in California